Monsieur Francis, Duke of Anjou and Alençon (18 March 1555  – 10 June 1584) was the youngest son of King Henry II of France and Catherine de' Medici.

Early years

He was scarred by smallpox at age eight, and his pitted face and slightly deformed spine did not suit his birth name of Hercule. He changed his name to Francis in honour of his late brother Francis II of France when he was confirmed.

The royal children were raised under the supervision of the governor and governess of the royal children, Claude d'Urfé and Françoise d'Humières, under the orders of Diane de Poitiers.

In 1574, following the death of his brother Charles IX of France and the accession of his other brother Henry III of France, he became heir to the throne. In 1576 he was made Duke of Anjou, Touraine, and Berry.

Alençon and the Huguenots

During the night of 13 September 1575, Alençon fled from the French court after being alienated from his brother King Henry III as they had had some differences. Both Henry III and Catherine de' Medici feared he would join the Protestant rebels. These fears proved well-founded; Francis joined the prince of Condé and his forces in the south. In February 1576 the King of Navarre escaped from the French court, whereupon his forces also joined Condé. This combined army was enough to force Henry III, without a pitched battle of any sort, to capitulate and sign the very pro-Protestant "peace of Monsieur", or Edict of Beaulieu, on 6 May 1576. By "secret treaties" which formed part of this peace settlement, many on the Protestant side were rewarded with land and titles. Francis was awarded the Duchy of Anjou (along with other lands) and thus became the Duke of Anjou. He had the writer Jean de La Gessée as a secretary.

Courting Elizabeth I

In 1579, negotiations commenced for marrying Anjou to Elizabeth I of England. The Duke of Anjou was in fact the only one of Elizabeth's foreign suitors to court her in person. He was 24 and Elizabeth was 46. Despite the age gap, the two soon became very close, Elizabeth dubbing him her "frog". While a few believe this nickname arose from a frog-shaped earring he had given her, "frog" has been an unflattering slang nickname for the French for centuries. Whether or not Elizabeth truly planned to marry Anjou is a hotly debated topic. She was quite fond of him, knowing that he was probably going to be her last suitor. The match was controversial among the English public: English Protestants warned the Queen that the "hearts [of the English people] will be galled when they shall see you take to husband a Frenchman, and a Papist ... the very common people well know this: that he is the son of the Jezebel of our age", referring to the Duke's mother, Catherine de' Medici. Among members of Elizabeth's Privy Council, only William Cecil, Lord Burghley, and Thomas Radclyffe, 3rd Earl of Sussex, supported the marriage scheme wholeheartedly. Most notable councillors, foremost among them Robert Dudley, 1st Earl of Leicester, and Sir Francis Walsingham, strongly opposed it, even warning the Queen of the hazards of childbirth at her age.

Between 1578 and 1581 the Queen resurrected attempts to negotiate a marriage with the Duke of Alençon, who had put himself forward as a protector of the Huguenots and a potential leader of the Dutch. In these years Walsingham became friends with the diplomat of Henry of Navarre in England, the anti-monarchist Philippe de Mornay. Walsingham was sent to France in mid-1581 to discuss an Anglo-French alliance, but the French wanted the marriage agreed first, and Walsingham had instructions to obtain a treaty before committing to the marriage. He returned to England without an agreement. Personally, Walsingham opposed the marriage, perhaps to the point of encouraging public opposition. Alençon was a Catholic, and as his elder brother, Henry III, was childless, he was heir presumptive to the French throne. Elizabeth was probably past the age of childbearing, and had no clear successor. If she died while married to the French heir, her realms could fall under French control. By comparing the match of Elizabeth and Alençon with the match of the Protestant Henry of Navarre and the Catholic Margaret of Valois, which occurred in the week before the St. Bartholomew's Day massacre, the "most horrible spectacle" he had ever witnessed, Walsingham raised the spectre of religious riots in England in the event of the marriage proceeding. According to the Earl of Leicester, Elizabeth tolerated his blunt opinions and often unwelcome advice, referring to Walsingham as "her Moor who cannot change his colour" with regard to his strong beliefs.

Eventually, Elizabeth pragmatically judged the union an unwise one, after considering the overwhelming opposition of her advisors. She continued, however, to play the engagement game, if only to warn Philip II of Spain, another of her suitors, what she might do, if it became necessary. Finally,  Elizabeth bade him farewell in 1581. On his departure she penned a poem, "On Monsieur's Departure", which, taken at face value, has lent credence to the notion that she may really have been prepared to go through with the match.

Anjou in the Netherlands
Anjou continued on to the Netherlands. In 1579 William the Silent had invited him to become hereditary sovereign of the United Provinces, and on 29 September 1580 the Dutch States General (with the exception of Zeeland and Holland) had signed the Treaty of Plessis-les-Tours with the Duke, who would assume the title "Protector of the Liberty of the Netherlands" and become the sovereign. He did not arrive until 10 February 1582, when William officially welcomed him in Flushing. In spite of the Joyous Entries he was accorded in Bruges and Ghent and his ceremonious installation as Duke of Brabant and Count of Flanders, Anjou was not popular with the Dutch and Flemish, who continued to see the Catholic French as enemies; the provinces of Zeeland and Holland refused to recognise him as their sovereign, and William, the central figure of the "Politiques" who worked to defuse religious hostilities, came under extensive criticism for his "French politics". 

He is now thought to have been the patron behind the "Valois tapestries" presented to Catherine de' Medici, which depicted major figures in Catherine's court against scenes of festivity. When Anjou's French troops arrived in late 1582, William's plan seemed to pay off, as even the Duke of Parma feared that the Dutch would now gain the upper hand.

However, Anjou himself, dissatisfied with his limited power, decided to take control of the Flemish cities of Antwerp, Bruges, Dunkirk, and Ostend by force.

He would personally lead the attack on Antwerp. To fool the citizens of Antwerp, Anjou proposed that he should make a "Joyous Entry" into the city, a grand ceremony in which he would be accompanied by his French troops. On 18 January 1583, Anjou entered Antwerp, but the citizens had not been deceived. The city militia ambushed and destroyed Anjou's force in the French Fury. Anjou barely escaped with his life.

Death

The debacle at Antwerp marked the end of Anjou's military career. His mother, Catherine de' Medici, is said to have written to him that "would to God you had died young. You would then not have been the cause of the death of so many brave gentlemen." Another insult followed when Elizabeth I formally ended her engagement to him after the massacre. The position of Anjou after this attack became impossible to hold, and he eventually left the country in June. His departure also discredited William, who nevertheless maintained his support for Anjou.

Soon Anjou fell seriously ill with "tertian ague", malaria. Catherine de' Medici brought him back to Paris, where he reconciled with his brother, King Henry III of France, in February 1584. Henry even embraced his brother, whom he had famously called le petit magot ("little macaque"). By June, the Duke of Anjou was dead. He was 29. His premature death meant that the Huguenot Henry of Navarre became heir-presumptive, thus leading to an escalation in the French Wars of Religion.

Titles 

1560–1584: Duke of Évreux
1566–1584: Duke of Alençon; Duke of Château-Thierry; Count of Perche; Count of Meulan; Count of Mantes
1576–1584: Duke of Anjou; Duke of Berry; Duke of Touraine
1580–1584: Lord of the Netherlands
1582–1584: Duke of Brabant, Count of Flanders

Ancestors

References

Bibliography

External links
 Portraits of François, Duke of Anjou (in French).

People from Fontainebleau
1555 births
1584 deaths
Burials at the Basilica of Saint-Denis
Francois, Duke of Anjou
Heirs presumptive to the French throne
French people of the French Wars of Religion
French people of the Eighty Years' War
People of the Elizabethan era
Dukes of Évreux
201
Dukes of Château-Thierry
Dukes of Anjou
Dukes of Berry
Dukes of Perche
Counts of Dreux
Counts of Meulan
Counts of Mantes
16th-century French nobility
Deaths from malaria
Sons of kings
Non-inheriting heirs presumptive
Dukes of Touraine